John M. Cochrane (March 11, 1859 – July 20, 1904) was an American judge who served as a justice of the Supreme Court of North Dakota from 1903 to 1904. He died in office.

Early life and education
Cochrane was born in Mount Pleasant, Pennsylvania. He moved with his parents to Canton, Illinois in 1861. In 1865, they moved further west to Faribault, Minnesota. In 1873, they moved to Minneapolis, Minnesota.

In 1976, Cochrane attended the State University of Minnesota. In 1879, he abegan attending University of Michigan Law School, graduating in 1881.

Career
Cochrane was admitted to the Minnesota Bar and practiced law in Minnesota until March 1883. In March 1883, Cochrane moved to Grand Forks, Dakota Territory. He practiced law there until the fall of 1894, when he was elected Probate Judge of Grand Forks County to a two-year term. He was reelected to this position in 1886, and resigned in 1887 in order to be accept his appointment as state's attorney of Grand Forks County. He won a full term as state's attorney in 1888 for a two-year term.

For several years, Cochrane taught criminal law at the University of North Dakota School of Law.

In 1902, Cochran was elected to the North Dakota Supreme Court. He served for only one year and seven months before dying in office on July 20, 1904 at the age of 45.

References

External links
North Dakota Supreme Court biography

Justices of the North Dakota Supreme Court
1859 births
1904 deaths
19th-century American judges
District attorneys in North Dakota
Minnesota lawyers
University of Michigan Law School alumni
People from Mount Pleasant, Pennsylvania
People from Canton, Illinois
People from Faribault, Minnesota
People from Minneapolis
People from Grand Forks, North Dakota